The Department of Climate Change was an Australian Government department that existed between 2007 and 2010.

Operational activities
The functions of the department were broadly classified into the following matters: 
Development and co-ordination of domestic and international climate change policy
International climate change negotiations
Design and implementation of emissions trading
Mandatory renewable energy target policy, regulation and co-ordination
Greenhouse emissions and energy consumption reporting
Climate change adaptation strategy and co-ordination
Co-ordination of climate change science activities
Renewable energy
Energy efficiency
Greenhouse gas abatement programs
Community and household climate action

References

Climate Change
Ministries established in 2007
2007 establishments in Australia
2010 disestablishments in Australia